CaixaForum Madrid is a cultural center in Madrid, Spain. Located in Paseo del Prado in a former power station, it is owned by the not-for-profit banking foundation "la Caixa". The art center opened its doors in 2008 and it hosts temporary art exhibitions and cultural events.

It was designed by the Swiss architects Herzog & de Meuron and built by Ferrovial between 2001 and 2007. It was an old power station called Central Del Mediodía, from the 1900s. The Vertical Garden by Patrick Blanc at the square is also well-known.

Gallery

See also
CaixaForum Lleida
CaixaForum Barcelona

References

External links

Official CaixaForum Madrid website—
Arcspace.com: Images and plans
Studiobanana.tv: Interview with Jacques Herzog — on the design of CaixcaForum.

Art museums and galleries in Madrid
Paseo del Prado
Modern art museums in Spain
Contemporary art galleries in Spain
Cultural centers in Spain
Museums established in 2001
2001 establishments in Spain
Buildings and structures in Cortes neighborhood, Madrid
Buildings and structures completed in 2007
Herzog & de Meuron buildings
La Caixa